Nilar Win (born 19 March 1997) is a Burmese footballer who plays as a forward. She has been a member of the Myanmar women's national team.

References

1997 births
Living people
Women's association football forwards
Burmese women's footballers
People from Mandalay Region
Myanmar women's international footballers